The Scotland Yard Mystery is a 1934 British crime film directed by Thomas Bentley and starring Sir Gerald du Maurier, George Curzon, Grete Natzler, Belle Chrystall and Wally Patch. The screenplay concerns a criminal doctor who operates a racket claiming life insurance by injecting victims with a life suspending serum turning them into living dead. The film is based on a play by Wallace Geoffrey. It was made by one of the biggest British companies of the era, British International Pictures, at their Welwyn Studios.

Plot summary

Cast
 Sir Gerald du Maurier as Commissioner Stanton
 George Curzon as Doctor Charles Masters
 Grete Natzler as Irene Masters
 Belle Chrystall as Mary Stanton
 Leslie Perrins as John Freeman
 Frederick Peisley as Kenneth Bailey
 Wally Patch (billed as Walter Patch) as Detective Sergeant George
 Henry Victor as Floyd
 Herbert Cameron as Paxton
 Paul Graetz as Paston

References

Bibliography
Low, Rachael. Filmmaking in 1930s Britain. George Allen & Unwin, 1985.
Wood, Linda. British Films, 1927-1939. British Film Institute, 1986.

External links
 

1934 films
1934 crime drama films
British crime drama films
Films shot at Welwyn Studios
1930s English-language films
Films directed by Thomas Bentley
Films set in London
British films based on plays
British black-and-white films
1930s British films